The Mess You Leave Behind is a Spanish thriller drama streaming television limited series created by Carlos Montero for Netflix, based on his novel of the same name. The series, starring Inma Cuesta and Bárbara Lennie, tracks a literature teacher who takes a substitute teaching position in a small fictional town in rural Galicia (Novariz) and learns that her predecessor died mysteriously.

The series premiered on 11 December 2020 on Netflix.

Main cast
 Inma Cuesta as Raquel Valero, a new literature teacher
 Bárbara Lennie as Elvira Ferreiro Martínez "Viruca", the old literature teacher who died under mysterious circumstances
 Tamar Novas as Germán Araujo, Raquel's drug-addicted husband
 Arón Piper as Iago Nogueira, a hotheaded student with a close relationship with Viruca
 Roberto Enríquez as Mauro Muñiz, Viruca's ex-husband
 Roque Ruiz as Roi Fernández, a friend of Iago's with a secret crush
 Isabel Garrido as Nerea Casado, another friend of Iago with a polarised relationship with Viruca
 Fede Pérez as Demetrio Araujo, Germán's brother
 Alfonso Agra as Tomás Nogueira, Iago's abusive father with criminal connections
 Susana Dans as Marga, the school  principal
 Xavier Estévez as Ramón, another teacher at the school
 Eduardo Rosa as Simòn, a friend of Germán with whom Raquel had a three-month affair.
 Xosé Touriñán as Gabriel Acevedo, a friend of Germán
 Maria Tasende as Iria, the school's English teacher
 María Costas as Claudia, Germán's mother
 Abril Zamora as Tere, Raquel's old friend
 Ana Santos as Concha, a bartender

Production 
The Mess You Leave Behind was filmed in locations in Galicia including Celanova, Ourense, whose public high school (the one in which the creator studied) was used to recreate the high school where characters Raquel and Viruca teach.

Episodes

Awards and nominations 

|-
| align = "center" rowspan = "8" | 2021 || rowspan = "8" | 19th Mestre Mateo Awards || colspan = "2" | Best Television Series ||  || rowspan = "8" | 
|-
| Best Screenplay || Carlos Montero, Javier Holgado, Andrés Seara  || 
|-
| Best Editing || Juan Galiñanes, Lu Rodríguez, Mario Maroto ||  
|-
| Best Sound || || 
|-
| Best Makeup and Hairstyling || Susana Veira, Beatriz Antelo || 
|-
| Best Lead Actress || Inma Cuesta || 
|-
| Best Supporting Actor || Tamar Novas || 
|-
| Best Supporting Actress || Isabel Garrido || 
|}

References

External links
 
 
 

2020s Spanish drama television series
2020 Spanish television series debuts
2020 Spanish television series endings
Spanish-language Netflix original programming
Spanish thriller television series
Television shows filmed in Spain
Television shows set in Galicia (Spain)
Television series based on Spanish novels